This is a list of flag bearers who have represented Algeria at the Olympics.

Flag bearers carry the national flag of their country at the opening ceremony of the Olympic Games.

Key

See also
Algeria at the Olympics

References

Algeria at the Olympics
Algeria
Olympic